Southeast Freeway, South Eastern Freeway, South East Freeway, or Southeast Expressway may refer to:

Australia
South Eastern Freeway,  a freeway running southeast from Adelaide to Murray Bridge in South Australia, part of the national M1 route
 South Eastern Freeway, a freeway amalgamated with the Mulgrave Freeway to create the Monash Freeway, a freeway in Victoria, Australia
 Southeast Freeway, the first section of the Pacific Motorway (Brisbane–Brunswick Heads), opened in 1972, Queensland, Australia

United States
Southeast Freeway (Baltimore), a Maryland highway designated I-695 and MD 702
Southeast Expressway (Massachusetts), designated I-93, US 1, and Route 3
Southeast Freeway (Washington, D.C.), designated I-695, as well as an unbuilt extension into Maryland as the Southeast Expressway